Jacques-Abraham Durand d'Aubigny (1707 – 1776) was French diplomat and lawyer of the Ancien Régime.

He was born on September 4, 1707 in Beaune.

He was appointed a Chevalier de l'Ordre de St Lazare.

See also
List of Ambassadors of France to the United Kingdom

References

1707 births
1776 deaths
Ambassadors of France to the United Kingdom